The Men's  time trial cycling events at the 2016 Summer Paralympics took place on September 17 at  Rio Olympic Velodrome. Three events took place over six classifications. Both the C1-3 and C4-5 time trials were 'factored' events.

Classification
Cyclists are given a classification depending on the type and extent of their disability. The classification system allows cyclists to compete against others with a similar level of function. The class number indicates the severity of impairment with "1" being most impaired.

Cycling classes for track cycling are:
B: Blind and visually impaired cyclists use a Tandem bicycle with a sighted pilot on the front
C 1-5: Cyclists with an impairment that affects their legs, arms and/or trunk but are capable of using a standard bicycle

Men's time trials

B

C1–3

C4–5

Men's time trial